Johnsons Point is a town in Saint Mary Parish, Antigua and Barbuda.

Demographics 
Johnsons Point has one enumeration district, 81700 JohnsonsPoint.

Census Data (2011)

Individual

Households 
Johnsons Point has 81 households.

References 

Saint Mary Parish, Antigua and Barbuda
Populated places in Antigua and Barbuda